Clarias nigricans is a species of clariid catfish. It is only known from the Mahakam River in eastern Borneo. The eel-like catfish of this region were long assumed to belong to the widespread species Clarias nieuhofii but examination of 6 specimens purchased from a fish market in Samarinda in 1999 and preserved specimens from the same location revealed consistent and distinctive differences indicating a separate species.

This is an elongated catfish up to 30.8 cm (12.1 inches) standard length. Compared to C. nieuhofii it has a "neck" distinctly narrower than the head, giving the head an egg-shaped appearance when viewed from above or below and the overall colour is much darker: purplish grey with much fainter white spots arranged in one row below the lateral line instead of two.

References

Ng, H. H. (2003). Clarias nigricans, a new species of clariid catfish (Teleostei: Siluriformes) from eastern Borneo. The Raffles Bulletin of Zoology 51: 393–398.
 

Clarias
Endemic fauna of Borneo
Endemic fauna of Indonesia
Freshwater fish of Indonesia
Taxa named by Heok Hee Ng
Fish described in 2003